Leonard Silverman (November 10, 1930 – September 7, 2015) was an American lawyer and politician from New York.

Life
He was born on November 10, 1930, in Brooklyn, New York City. He graduated from New York University, and in 1954 from Brooklyn Law School.

Silverman entered politics as a Democrat, and was a member of the New York State Assembly (48th D.) from 1969 to 1977, sitting in the 178th, 179th, 180th, 181st and 182nd New York State Legislatures. He was Chairman of the Committee on Insurance.

On May 6, 1977, he was appointed to the New York Court of Claims and remained on the bench until 2004.

He died on September 7, 2015, in Woodmere, Nassau County, New York; and was buried at the Mount Carmel Cemetery in Glendale, Queens.

References

1930 births
2015 deaths
Politicians from Brooklyn
Democratic Party members of the New York State Assembly
New York (state) state court judges
Brooklyn Law School alumni
New York University alumni
20th-century American judges